Hillsdale State Park is a state park in Paola, Kansas, United States.

This park located in eastern Kansas was built on the shore of Hillsdale Lake which was completed in 1982. The park itself was established and opened in 1994. The state park features two hiking trails.

See also
 Hillsdale Lake
 List of Kansas state parks
 List of lakes, reservoirs, and dams in Kansas
 List of rivers of Kansas

References

External links

State parks of Kansas
Protected areas of Miami County, Kansas
Protected areas established in 1994